Patricia Katherine Scrymgeour-Wedderburn, Countess of Dundee (née Montagu Douglas Scott, formerly Faulkner, 9 October 1910 - December 3, 2012) was the Countess of Dundee and the daughter of Lord Herbert Montagu Douglas Scott who was son of William Montagu Douglas Scott, 6th Duke of Buccleuch.

She was paternal grandaunt of Sarah, Duchess of York, former wife of Prince Andrew, Duke of York, second son of Queen Elizabeth II, making him great-grandaunt of Princess Beatrice and Princess Eugenie. She's also first cousin of Princess Alice, Duchess of Gloucester, wife of Prince Henry, Duke of Gloucester, brother of Kings Edward VIII and George VI and uncle of Queen Elizabeth II.

Patricia was married three times. She first married Walter Douglas Faulkner MC on 8 July 1930, in England. Then she was widowed, and married David Scrymgeour-Wedderburn (later considered de jure 10th Earl of Dundee) on 9 September 1940. Then she was widowed again, and married her brother-in-law Henry James Scrymgeour, which took place on October 30, 1946 in London, England. Patricia had a total of six children by three fathers. Her son Alexander is the Earl of Dundee and her daughter Elizabeth is now the Dowager Lady Teynham.

The Dowager Countess of Dundee died on 3 December 2012, in her home Birkhill Castle, Scotland. She lived for 102 years.

References 

1910 births
2012 deaths
Dundee
Scottish centenarians
Women centenarians
People from Hertfordshire (before 1965)